Dipterichthys is an extinct genus of prehistoric bony fish that lived during the early Oligocene epoch.

References

Prehistoric perciform genera
Oligocene fish